Karinthy (means "from Carinthia, Carinthian"; corresponds to) may refer to:

 Frigyes Karinthy - Hungarian writer and translator
 Ferenc Karinthy - Hungarian writer and translator, son of Frigyes Karinthy
 Márton Karinthy - Hungarian writer and theatre director, son of Ferenc Karinthy
 Gábor Karinthy - Hungarian poet, son of Frigyes Karinthy

See also 
 Carantania

Hungarian-language surnames
Carinthia (state)